Hane may refer to:

Hane, Marquesas Islands
Hane (Go), term of the board game Go
Hane Station, Ōda, Shimane Prefecture
Hane Station (Ishikawa), a former railway station in Noto, Hōsu District, Ishikawa Prefecture  
Hane (Kotoko album), 2004 album by Kotoko
Hane (Tatsuya Ishii album), 2003 album by Tatsuya Ishii
High-altitude nuclear explosion (HANE)

People with the surname
, Japanese Go player
, Japanese Go player

Japanese-language surnames